Immerman is a surname. Notable people with the surname include:

Karl Immermann (1796–1840), German dramatist, novelist, and poet
Neil Immerman (born 1953), American computer scientist
Richard H. Immerman (born 1949), American historian and writer

See also
Immelman